Taras Valko (born 2 February 1985) is a Belarusian sprint canoeist who has competed in the late 2000s. He won a gold medal in the K-4 200 m event at the 2009 ICF Canoe Sprint World Championships in Dartmouth.

References
Canoe09.ca profile 

1985 births
Belarusian male canoeists
Living people
ICF Canoe Sprint World Championships medalists in kayak
Canoeists at the 2015 European Games
European Games competitors for Belarus